Arnar Grétarsson (born 20 February 1972 in Reykjavík) is an Icelandic former professional football player and current manager of Valur.

Club career
Arnar started his career in Breiðablik, where he played for several years until he joined Leiftur in 1997, where he stayed for one year. His next club was AEK Athens FC, where he stayed for three years. After his contract expired in 2000, Arnar signed for Belgian club K.S.C. Lokeren, where he played until 2006, when he moved back to his homeland to play for Breiðablik again.

International career
Arnar made his debut for Iceland in the famous 5–1 shock defeat of Turkey in a September 1991 friendly match. He has been capped 71 times for Iceland, scoring two goals. His last international match was an October 2004 World Cup qualifying match against Malta.

Coaching career
In 2009, Arnar was appointed Assistant Manager of Breiðablik. In April 2010, Greek side AEK Athens F.C. appointed him as Director of Football. He left the club due to reorganization in the summer of 2012.

In 2013, he was appointed as Sporting Director with Belgian team Club Brugge.

In late 2014 he was appointed as Manager of Breiðablik ahead of the 2015 season.

In a major reshake in the fall of 2022 he was appointed by Valur as their manager soon after the he was sacked as manager of KA Akureyri, after having notable success as manager in the northern capital the Icelandic giants hope to bring stability to their setup.

His older brother, Sigurður, was also an Iceland international.

References

External links
 
 Arnar Grétarsson at Soccerway

1972 births
Living people
Arnar Gretarsson
Arnar Gretarsson
Arnar Gretarsson
Arnar Gretarsson
Rangers F.C. players
AEK Athens F.C. players
K.S.C. Lokeren Oost-Vlaanderen players
Expatriate footballers in Scotland
Arnar Gretarsson
Expatriate footballers in Greece
Arnar Gretarsson
Expatriate footballers in Belgium
AEK F.C. non-playing staff
Arnar Gretarsson
Super League Greece players
Belgian Pro League players
Association football midfielders
Úrvalsdeild karla (football) managers
K.S.V. Roeselare managers
Icelandic football managers